List of traditional musicians from County Clare is an overview of notable musicians active in traditional Irish music who are considered Claremen or Clarewomen, either by birth or longtime association.

Accordion
 Joe Cooley

Banjo
 Pecker Dunne (also singing, fiddle, melodeon and guitar)
 Jimmy Ward

Concertina
 Elizabeth Crotty
 Kitty Hayes
 Noel Hill
 Gearóid Ó hAllmhuráin
 Packie Russell

Fiddle
 Paddy Canny
 Junior Crehan
 Dan Furey (also dance teacher)
 Nell Galvin (also concertina)
 Martin Hayes
 Patrick Kelly

Flute and whistle
 Peadar O'Loughlin (also uilleann pipes and fiddle)
 Gussie Russell
 Micho Russell

Uilleann pipes
 Gearóid de Barra
 Willie Clancy

Singer
 Tom Lenihan
 Nonie Lynch

Céilí band
 Laichtín Naofa Céilí Band
 The Kilfenora Céilí Band
 The Tulla Céilí Band

See also
 Tom Munnelly - folklorist and promoter
 Muiris Ó Rócháin - director Willie Clancy Summer School and folklorist
 The Clare Festival of Traditional Singing

Lists of Irish people
Trad
Irish folk musicians
Lists of musicians by genre
Lists of musicians by nationality